Sharon Fichman was the defending champion, having won the event in 2012, but she lost in the quarterfinals to Gabriela Dabrowski.

Julia Glushko won the title, defeating Dabrowski in the final, 6–1, 6–3.

Seeds

Main draw

Finals

Top half

Bottom half

References 
 Main draw

Cooper Challenger
Waterloo Challenger